Al-Duhail Sports Club, formerly Lekhwiya SC, is a Qatari sports club, best known for its football team, which plays in the Qatar Stars League. The club is based in the Duhail district in the city of Doha and plays its home games at Abdullah bin Khalifa Stadium. It is the first team in Qatari football to win the first division title on its debut season.

In April 2017, it was announced that the club would take over El Jaish SC and merge with following the 2016–17 Qatar Stars League and be known as Al-Duhail Sports Club in rebranding of Lekhwiya SC.

History
The club was founded as Al-Shorta Doha and in 2009 was renamed to Lekhwiya. Lekhwiya Club has the biggest financial budget in Qatar.

Upon the club's reformation, it was entered into the Qatari 2nd Division. It came fourth in the league on its first year before winning the next season in 2010.

In the club's first season in the Qatar Stars League, Lekhwiya finished at the top of the standings to win the 2010–11 Qatar Stars League. It was the first league title in the club's history. They also managed to reach the final of the 2010 Sheikh Jassem Cup, before losing in the final to Al-Arabi.

Their first official debut in a continental competition came on March 7, 2012, in the 2012 AFC Champions League. They won their first match against Al-Ahli of Saudi Arabia, with Nam Tae-Hee scoring the only goal and also scoring the first-ever goal for Lekhwiya in any regional competition.

In the 2011–12 Qatar Stars League season, Lekhwiya retained the league title with two games left to be played.

They inaugurated a new stadium Abdullah bin Khalifa Stadium, also known as Lekhwiya Sports Stadium, on February 15, 2013 in a match against Al Khor and won their third league title in the first season at the new stadium.

in April 2017 the club announced that they would take over El Jaish SC and rebranded the club into Al-Duhail SC.

At the end of the 2017–2018 Season the Club became the first club to hold all three domestic Titles the league, Qatar Cup and Emir Cup.

Stadium

Lekhwiya's stadium began construction in 2011. The first phase was completed in May 2012. The stadium was officially inaugurated on February 15, 2013 with the first match played being a Qatar Stars League fixture against Al Khor. The official seating capacity is 10,000, it is located in the ISF area of Doha.

Colours and crest

Shirt sponsors and manufacturers

Kit history

Players

Out on loan

Personnel

Current technical staff

Records and statistics
Last update: 19 March 2023.
<small> Players whose names are in bold are still active with the club.</small>

Reserves and academy

Lekhwiya's reserve team currently competes in the Qatargas League, the second-tier of Qatari football.  Last update: July 2014

Reserve team technical staff

U21 technical staff

Administrative staff

Board of Directors

Management (Football)

Honours
Qatar Stars League
Winners (7): 2010–11, 2011–12, 2013–14, 2014–15, 2016–17, 2017–18, 2019–20

Qatari Second Division
Winners: 2009–10

Emir of Qatar Cup
Winners (4): 2016, 2018, 2019, 2022

Qatar Cup
Winners (3): 2013, 2015, 2018

Qatar Super Cup / Shiekh Jassem Cup
Winners (2): 2015, 2016

Al-Duhail in Asia

Q = Qualification
GS = Group stage
R16 = Round of 16
QF = Quarter-final
SF = Semi-final

AFC Champions League

Managerial history

 Khalifa Khamis (2008) (unofficial) Abdullah Saad (2008–2009) (unofficial)''
 Abdullah Mubarak (2009–2010)
 Djamel Belmadi (2010–2012)
 Eric Gerets (2012–2014)
 Michael Laudrup (2014–2015)
 Djamel Belmadi (2015–2018)
 Nabil Maâloul (2018–2019)
 Rui Faria (2019–2020)
 Walid Regragui (2020)
 Hatem Almoadab (2020)
 Sabri Lamouchi (2020–2021)
 Luís Castro (2021–2022)
 Hernán Crespo (2022–present)

Other sports

Handball

References

External links
 Official website

 
Football clubs in Qatar
Football clubs in Doha
Association football clubs established in 2009
Multi-sport clubs in Qatar
Police association football clubs